Mikael Sandy (born 16 July 1982) is a Swedish snowboarder. He competed in the men's halfpipe event at the 2006 Winter Olympics.

References

External links
 

1982 births
Living people
Swedish male snowboarders
Olympic snowboarders of Sweden
Snowboarders at the 2006 Winter Olympics
People from Leksand Municipality
Sportspeople from Dalarna County
21st-century Swedish people